A Boston bun, also known as a Sally Lunn, is a large spiced bun with a thick layer of coconut icing, prevalent in Australia and New Zealand. Traditionally the bun contains sieved mashed potato, and modern versions sometimes contain raisins or sultanas, the inclusion of which dates from the 1930s. Records for the sale of a product named "Boston Bun" can be found dating from the early 20th century. It is often served sliced and buttered, to accompany a cup of tea. The origin of the name is unknown. In the North Island of New Zealand, it is also known as a "Sally Lunn", although it has no relation to the traditional English bun of the same name.

See also
 Sally Lunn bun
 List of buns

References

External links
Australian Boston Bun
Boston Bun Recipe from Recipezaar.com
Women’s Weekly Boston Bun Recipe

Australian cuisine
Australian breads
New Zealand cuisine
New Zealand breads
Sweet breads
Buns
Foods containing coconut
Australian desserts